Harry Hurt III (born November 13, 1951) is an American author and journalist. He was formerly senior editor of the Texas Monthly and a Newsweek correspondent, and his articles have appeared in publications such as The New York Times,  Sports Illustrated, Esquire and Playboy. His books include Texas Rich, a biography of oil tycoon H. L. Hunt and family; and Lost Tycoon: The Many Lives of Donald J. Trump (1993), an unauthorized biography of real estate mogul and 45th President of the United States, Donald Trump.

Hurt was born in Houston, Texas, the son of Margaret (Birting) Hurt and Harry Hurt Jr., who was president of Hurt Oil Company in Houston. He graduated from Choate School in 1969 and Harvard College in 1974, where he wrote for the Harvard Crimson. He worked for the Texas Monthly in Austin, serving as senior editor from 1975 to 1986. He later moved to Sag Harbor, New York, and married Alison Becker in 1993. He also had an early career in professional golf, which he revisited in the mid-1990s in writing Chasing the Dream: A Mid-life Quest for Fame and Fortune on the Pro Golf Circuit.

Books
Texas Rich: The Hunt Dynasty from the Early Oil Days Through the Silver Crash, W.W. Norton (1981)
For All Mankind, Atlantic Monthly Press (1988)
Lost Tycoon: The Many Lives of Donald J. Trump, W.W. Norton (1993)
Chasing the Dream: A Midlife Quest for Fame and Fortune on the Pro Golf Circuit, Avon Books (1997), 
How to Learn Golf, Pocket Books (2002)
Hurt Yourself: In Executive Pursuit of Action, Danger, and a Decent Looking Pair of Swim Trunks, St. Martin’s Press (2008)

References

1951 births
Living people
20th-century American journalists
21st-century American journalists
American biographers
American magazine editors
American male journalists
People from Houston
Writers from Texas
Choate Rosemary Hall alumni
The Harvard Crimson people
American male biographers